The Parish of the National Shrine of Our Lady of Fatima (Filipino: Pambansang Dambana ng Birhen ng Fatima) is a parish church and national shrine in the Diocese of Malolos in the Philippines. It serves as a Philippine apostolate of Our Lady of Fatima in Fátima, Portugal, which is recognized by the Roman Catholic Church in the Philippines. The shrine is located near the Our Lady of Fatima University campus in Marulas, Valenzuela City in Metro Manila, Philippines. The shrine is one of the three major pilgrimage sites in the Diocese of Malolos, with the National Shrine of St. Anne in Hagonoy and the National Shrine of Divine Mercy in Marilao as the other sites.

The National Shrine of Our Lady of Fatima is the home of the National Pilgrim Image (NPI) of Our Lady of Fatima, the image that became the forefront of the 1986 EDSA People Power Revolution.

History

The Birth of the Fatima Parish in Valenzuela
Forty-three years after Our Lady’s apparition in Fatima, the devotion to her reached the shores of the Orient through the establishment of the first chapter of the Blue Army of Our Lady of Fatima, now known as the World Apostolate of Fatima, in Mangaldan, Pangasinan in 1961, a year after July 21, 1960, when the town of Polo was divided which resulted to the creation of the new municipality of Valenzuela pursuant to the Executive Order 401 signed by then President Carlos P. Garcia. The new town comprised ten barrios that were excluded from the old town of Polo: Karuhatan, Marulas, Malinta, Torres Bugallon (now Gen. T. de Leon), Ugong, Mapulang Lupa, Paso de Blas, Maysan, Canumay, and Bagbaguin. The old church of San Diego de Alcala in Polo, Bulacan, built by the Franciscan friars in 1629, was too far for the people of Valenzuela. It was the time when they, yearning for the love of the Lord, were in need for a church that can be called their own.

The Canonical Establishment and Early Years of the Parish
Responding to the need to form a new parish aside from the old one in Polo, Manila Archbishop Rufino Cardinal Santos canonically established on March 7, 1961, a new parish in Valenzuela and appointed Reverend Father Espiritu D. Izon as its first parish priest. Cardinal Santos readily agreed to the suggestion of Izon that the new parish be placed under the patronage of Our Lady of Fatima. Little did he know that the institution of the new parish would soon become a midpoint of Marian devotion in the town and eventually in the country.

Upon the creation of the parish, there was no yet available place where a church and rectory could be built. Izon started working to fulfill the realization of such endeavor despite the fact that there were also no facilities and equipment for the liturgical services and no funds to start them. Thankfully, the late Don Vicente Araneta generously offered the use of the chapel of their company, the Gregorio Araneta Machineries Inc. (GAMI) compound near McArthur Highway, as the temporary parish church and convent. It would then be easy for Izon to scout for a place suited for the about-to-built parish church. It was also in this chapel where the life-size wooden image of Our Lady of Fatima, a donation from Jose Delos Santos, was first enshrined. For the next years, Father Izon unfolded his plans to build a community of faithful in the parish, including the organization of the parish pastoral council and some religious associations. Not long, the need to start building a church edifice in honor of Our Lady of Fatima remained to be an urgent priority.

Meanwhile, on September 11, 1963, through an Executive Order issued by President Diosdado Macapagal, he reunited the two separated towns of Polo and Valenzuela and retained the name Valenzuela for the reunified town, in memory of the homegrown hero, Dr. Pio Valenzuela.

Because of the necessity to build the church, Izon sought the help of the parishioners and went to different places nearby to look for an appropriate site where the church and rectory could be constructed. After his many struggles, he approached and appealed to the kindness of the children of Don Emeterio Barcelon to donate a part of their land situated at the highest portion of Pag-asa I Subdivision. The Barcelon Family donated 3,000 square meter lot which is 1,000 meters from McArthur Highway.

Building Our Lady’s Church
After the lot was turned-over to the parish, Izon requested Architect Marcelo Samaniego to draw a blueprint of the unique church with a fan-shape structure and Engineer David Consunji to prepare the specifications. On February 7, 1965, Most Reverend Manuel P. Del Rosario, Bishop of Malolos, blessed and laid the cornerstone of the church. This began the tiresome years for its completion.

One main problem was the lack of funds for the construction. Izon had to draw plans for it to be able to collect sufficient funds needed for the would-be shrine. The various fund-raising campaigns organized by the Construction Committee, consisted of Vincent Araneta, Jr., Judge Lorenzo Valentin, Rafael Alba, Dr. Gregorio Orcino, Former Vice-Mayor Isidoro Arenas, and Martin Candido were fully supported by the parishioners. Furthermore, the leadership of the Parish Pastoral Council Presidents such as Cesar Villaruel, Gregorio Marcelo, Dr. Jose Tecson, Felicisimo Agas, Felipe Sineneng, and Carlo Magno became thriving. This made possible the completion of the basement of the church which was in time for its blessing in March 1974 where Masses and other liturgical activities were temporarily held.

Several organizations also rendered a great help for soliciting funds for the construction. These were the Catholic Women's League, Legion of Mary, Catholic Youth Organization, Apostolado ng Panalangin, Block Rosary Movement, Confraternity of Our Lady of Lourdes, Knights of Columbus, and Adoracion Nocturna Filipina. In gratitude to these organizations, the streets within the church vicinity were named after them.

After more than ten years of slow and painstaking progress of the construction of the church, Servando Floro, Lydia de Dios, Magno, and Agas suggested to have dawn penitential procession every First Saturday of the month as an offering of the faithful for the immediate completion of the church which Izon positively approved. Barefoot devotees regularly attended the procession, and, not long afterwards, large donations came from benefactors and considerable amounts were produced in fund raising projects.

An Extraordinary Honor: National Shrine of Our Lady of Fatima
Two years after the blessing of the basement, in the middle of the enormous construction project, the Catholic Bishops' Conference of the Philippines (CBCP), then headed by Julio Cardinal Rosales, declared that the parish would become a National Shrine on June 12, 1976. Deeply honored and jubilant, parishioners and devotees of Our Lady presumed leadership in spreading the devotion to and message of Our Lady of Fatima not only in Valenzuela but throughout the adjacent towns of the Bulacan Province and Metro Manila and eventually in the whole Philippines. The declaration of the parish as a national shrine also paved the way for the visitations of the image of Our Lady of Fatima in the Diocese of Malolos which started between July 1977 to June 1978, under the leadership of the diocese's second bishop, Cirilo R. Almario, Jr. It was also noteworthy that as the people venerated and showed special love for Our Lady, they also voluntarily contributed generously for the completion of the shrine. Encouraged by the warm response of communities in the parish visitation, home visitations of the image of Our Lady were also conducted. This made the national shrine fulfill its duty of campaigning for the widespread devotion to Our Lady of Fatima.

Mass media coverage was also given attention to further promote the message of Fatima and the national shrine as well. Press releases in major dailies, broadcasts of the Catholic radio station Radio Veritas, and Sunday television Masses made the shrine a suitable place of worship to the Lord and devotion to the Blessed Virgin Mary.

The Canonical Coronation of the Patroness
After it was proclaimed as a national shrine, the solemn canonical coronation of the image of Our Lady of Fatima, which was first enshrined at the GAMI Chapel, was held on March 6, 1977. The Eucharistic celebration was headed by Bishop Almario. Doña Josefa Edralin Marcos, mother of the former Philippine President Ferdinand Marcos, led the canonical coronation ceremony and was assisted by Amparo Aspiras while Carmen Santos donated the crown. The rites took place at the basement of the church.

On September 4, 1982, Izon approved the creation of the World Apostolate of Fatima chapter in the parish, which received astonishing support from the parishioners as well as the lay leaders. Since the national shrine was slowly becoming known in the country, then Tourism Minister Jose D. Aspiras declared it as a tourist site on December 3, 1982.

The Dedication of the National Shrine

The Solemn Dedication Rites of the National Shrine was held in the morning of December 11, 1982. It was led by the Apostolic Nuncio to the Philippines, Archbishop Bruno Torpigliani, as the principal consecrator, while Manila Archbishop Jaime Cardinal Sin as the main celebrant and homilist of the Eucharistic Celebration. Twelve archbishops and bishops from the different parts of the country were the consecrators of the 12 crosses. Luciano Guerra, rector of the Sanctuary and Shrine of Our Lady of Fatima in Fatima, Portugal graced the event as representative of the Bishop of Leiria, Alberto Cosme do Amaral. The rites of dedication rewarded the rigorous efforts of Izon, the lay leaders, parishioners, devotees, and benefactors in completing the construction of the church, after years of planning and fundraising.

Rectors
Below is the list of shrine rectors, who also function as pastor or parish priest.

References

 The National Shrine of Our Lady of Fatima

External links
 
 Replica of the Apparition of the Angel of Portugal to the Three Little Shepherds at the Loca do Cabeco, Sierra de Aire, Fatima, Portugal
 The National Shrine of Our Lady of Fatima
 

Shrines to the Virgin Mary
Roman Catholic churches in Metro Manila
Buildings and structures in Valenzuela, Metro Manila
Roman Catholic national shrines in the Philippines
Churches in the Roman Catholic Diocese of Malolos